John Edwards (1760–98) was the eighth intendant (mayor) of Charleston, South Carolina, serving two terms from 1795 to 1797.

Edwards was born in 1760 to John Edwards and Margaret Peronneau. He served as an aide-de-camp to Francis Marion during the Revolutionary War and married Rebecca Donnom in 1783. Edwards was elected from the Charleston area to the General Assembly for 1787–1788, but he resigned his position when he was appointed Commissioner of the South Carolina Treasury. For 1791 to 1794, he was again elected to the General Assembly. Edwards was elected intendant September 26, 1795, and was re-elected September 12, 1796. After his tenure as mayor, Edwards returned to the Statehouse and served in the South Carolina Senate in 1799 to 1801. He died on December 31, 1798.

References

Mayors of Charleston, South Carolina
1760 births
1798 deaths